"Live It Up" is a song by Australian rapper 360, featuring vocals from Pez. Written by Dennis Dowlut, Styalz Fuego Matthew James Colwell and Perry Chapman, the song was released in April 2014 as the third single from 360's third studio album, Utopia (2014). The song's accompanying music video runs for approximately three minutes and fifty-nine seconds. "Live It Up" was a moderate commercial success, debuting and peaking at number twenty-one on the Australian ARIA Singles Chart, thus becoming 360's third highest charting single to date after "Boys like You" (No. 3 in 2012) and "Price of Fame" (No. 19 in 2014) respectively. It was certified gold by the Australian Recording Industry Association (ARIA) for shipments in excess of 35,000 copies.

Background
During an interview with themusic.com.au, 360 commented, "Live It Up is a song I wrote with Pez; it's about living what little time you have here to the fullest. It's also about trying to find positives in negative situations. We only have one life so why not make it the best time ever?"

Charts

Certifications

References 

2014 singles
2014 songs
360 (rapper) songs
Universal Records singles